Spathoglottis kimballiana is a species of orchid found from Borneo to the Philippines.

(

kimballiana